Richard Newman (born November 2) is an American actor who is notable for his numerous voice roles in Transformers.

Career
Newman started his voice-over career in 1990 with Dragon Warrior. He has also had roles in Dragon Ball Z, RoboCop: Alpha Commando, Sherlock Holmes in the 22nd Century,  and Spider-Man Unlimited as well as InuYasha, Oban Star Racers, MegaMan NT Warrior, and Bucky O'Hare and the Toad Wars. He is perhaps best known for his portrayals of Rhinox in Beast Wars: Transformers (Beasties in Canada) and M. Bison in the Street Fighter cartoon series. Newman also provided arch-villain Phaeton's voice in the animated television series Exosquad. Among his most recent roles are Bear Hugger (a Canadian boxer) in Punch-Out!!, and Cranky Doodle Donkey in My Little Pony: Friendship is Magic.

In the late 1990s, Newman  went over to Toronto to work with the successful animation company Nelvana and lent his voice to some of their projects including Franklin, Donkey Kong Country and Pippi Longstocking.

Newman's credits also include theatre work. During the 2011 season of Vancouver's Bard on the Beach festival, he was acclaimed for his performance as Shylock in The Merchant of Venice and was nominated for a Jessie Award for "Outstanding Performance by an Actor in a Supporting Role, Large Theatre".  His more recent work includes playing the title character in City Stage New West's 2012 production of King Lear, as well as playing Tosca in Neworld Theatre's production of Doost (Friend).

Filmography

Film

Television
Alienators: Evolution Continues – Additional Voices
Animated Classic Showcase – Various characters
Beast Wars – Rhinox, the Vok
Beast Machines – Rhinox-Tankor
Being Ian – Principal Bill McCammon
Beyblade Burst Evolution - Raul Comas (ep. 21-51), Principal Shinoda
Billy the Cat – Additional Voices
Black Lagoon – Ratchman
Bob the Builder – Two-Tonne (US)
Boys Over Flowers – Yasukichi Makino
Bucky O'Hare and the Toad Wars – Toadborg, Wolf
Camp Candy – Additional Voices
Cardcaptors – Keroberos (true form)
Class of the Titans – Chiron
Conan the Adventurer – Set, Conn, Serpent Man, Blacksmith, Pict, Dong Hee, Captain Righello, Sekra (aka The Burning Skull), Grand Wizard, Demetrio, Spellbinder, Jhebbal Sag
The Cramp Twins – Pony Protection Man
Donkey Kong Country – Green Kroc
Dragon Ball Z (The Ocean Group dub) – Captain Ginyu, Oolong (Second voice), Porunga, Banan, Strock, Additional Voices
Dragon Booster – Dragon Jousting Announcer
Dragon Tales – Mr. Knack Knack
Dragon Warrior – Wizard Moore
Edgar & Ellen – Mayor Knightleigh, Construction Worker, Alien 2
Elemental Gelade – Kinnbart
Exosquad – Phaeton
Fat Dog Mendoza – Additional Voices
Franklin – Mr. Turtle
Franklin and Friends – Mr. Turtle
Funky Fables – Narrator, Sebastian, Doctor
G.I. Joe Extreme – Iron Klaw
Gadget and the Gadgetinis – Additional Voices
Gundam SEED – Lewis Halberton
Gundam Wing – Chief Engineer Tsuborov
Hamtaro – Laura's Grandfather
He-Man and the Masters of the Universe (2002) – Rattlor, The Faceless One, Lord Dactys, Azdar, Additional Voices
Hurricanes – Additional Voices
Hello Carbot — Proud
Inuyasha – Tōtōsai, Spider-Head Demon, Sōju Asano, Additional Voices
Inuyasha: The Final Act – Tōtōsai, Wolf Demon Tribe ancestors, Bone demon's father, Additional Voices
Johnny Test – Professor Slopsink
Kong: The Animated Series – Howling Jack Crockett
Let's Go Quintuplets – Grampa
Level Up – Merchant
Madeline – Additional Voices
Make Way for Noddy – Mr. Plod - (UK/US)
Mary-Kate and Ashley in Action! – Additional Voices
Master Keaton – Andrei Semionov
Mega Man – Wood Man, Spark Mandrill
MegaMan NT Warrior – Maysa/Commander Beef
Mobile Suit Gundam 00 – Massoud Rachmadi
Mobile Suit Gundam: Encounters in Space – Eiphar Synapse, Yuri Hasler
Monster Rancher – Golem (1999–2000), Daton, Grandfather, Various
¡Mucha Lucha! – El Phantasmo
My Little Pony: Friendship is Magic – Cranky Doodle Donkey
NASCAR Racers – Jack Fassler, Spex
The New Adventures of Kimba The White Lion – Old Dice
Ninjago: Masters of Spinjitzu – General Cryptor, The Emperor of Ninjago
Ōban Star-Racers – Rush, President McMillan, Creator
Pac-Man and the Ghostly Adventures - Santa Pac
Pippi Longstocking – Additional Voices
Please Save My Earth – Lazlo
Pocket Dragon Adventures – Additional Voices
Project A-ko: Grey Side/Blue Side – Maruten, Kotobuki's Secretary
Pucca – Master Soo
Raggs Kids Club Band – Dumpster the Cat
Ranma ½ – Kimen, Manpukuji Priest, Zardon, Harumaki
RoboCop: Alpha Commando – Additional Voices
Rollbots – Kibi
Ronin Warriors – Anubis/Kale, Dr. Koji/Yagiyu, Saranbou
ReBoot – Daecon
Ricky Sprocket: Showbiz Boy
Roswell Conspiracies: Aliens, Myths and Legends – Chauf
Saber Marionette J – Hikozaemon, Master Soemon Obiichi
Shadow Raiders – Additional Voices
Sherlock Holmes in the 22nd Century – Professor James Moriarty
Silverwing – Brutus, Throbb, Zephyr
Skysurfer Strike Force – Five Eyes, Grenader
Spider-Man Unlimited – High Evolutionary, J. Jonah Jameson, Dr. Brofsky, Additional Voices
Street Fighter – M. Bison
Superbook – Moses
Super Duper Sumos – Wisdom San
The Little Prince (2010) - Laudion (B 370 episodes 13-14, Planet of the Globies)
The Vision of Escaflowne – Emperor Dornkirk, Gaou Fanel (Bandai Entertainment dub)
Tico of the Seven Seas
Transformers: Cybertron – Vector Prime
Transformers: Energon – Megatron (Episode 14 only)
Tobot — Tobot V
Trollz – Additional Voices
Trouble Chocolate - Mozzarella
Video Girl Ai – Gokuraku Manager
Video Power (The Power Team)
Vor-Tech: Undercover Conversion Squad – Additional Voices
X-Men: Evolution – Omega Red, Additional Voices
Yashahime: Princess Half-Demon – Tōtōsai

Video games

Staff work
 Big Meat Eater – Singer
 Funky Fables – Additional Director (Voice)
 Hooray for Sandbox Land – Producer (Goldrush Recording Company)
 Sugar and Spice – Additional Director (Voice)

References

External links

Living people
American emigrants to Canada
American impressionists (entertainers)
American male film actors
American male television actors
American male video game actors
American male voice actors
American voice directors
Year of birth missing (living people)
20th-century American comedians
21st-century American comedians
20th-century American male actors
21st-century American male actors